Ron Spanuth (born 25 March 1980) is a German cross-country skier who competed from 1997 to 2002. He won a bronze medal in the 4 × 10 km relay at the 2001 FIS Nordic World Ski Championships in Lahti and earned his best individual finish of 18th in the 50 km event at those same championships.

Spanuth won four races up to 15 km in his career in 1999 and 2000.

Cross-country skiing results
All results are sourced from the International Ski Federation (FIS).

World Championships
 1 medal – (1 bronze)

World Cup

Season standings

References

External links 

1980 births
Living people
German male cross-country skiers
FIS Nordic World Ski Championships medalists in cross-country skiing
21st-century German people